Samuel Marcus Dill (20 December 184323 January 1924) was an Irish-born minister who served as Moderator of the General Assembly of the Church of Scotland in 1912.

Life
He was born on 20 December 1843, the eldest son of Prof Robert Foster Dill MD, Professor of Midwifery at Queens College, Belfast, and his wife, Catherine Haughton Rentoul.

He was educated at the Geneva Theological College and at Queen's College, Belfast.

He was licensed to preach in December 1867 and began his ministry soon after in Lower Cumber, Killaoo in County Londonderry. In 1874 he was called to Ballymena to replace his namesake uncle, Rev Samuel Marcus Dill (1811-1870), who was also a noted theological author.

In 1881 he left Ireland and joined the Church of Scotland to preach at Alloway in Ayrshire. He was minister of Alloway for at least 30 years, and was still in this position in 1912 when he was appointed Moderator.

He died on 23 January 1924.

Family

In 1878 he married Agnes Graham Rowe (d. 1934), daughter of John James Rowe. They had nine children.

He was a first cousin to Sir Samuel Dill.

References

1843 births
1924 deaths
Moderators of the General Assembly of the Church of Scotland
Irish Presbyterian ministers
19th-century Ministers of the Church of Scotland
20th-century Ministers of the Church of Scotland